Before and After is the third studio album by English duo Chad & Jeremy, released on 24 May 1965. It was the first record the duo released for Columbia Records. This album includes many sunshine pop, baroque pop and folk rock-styled songs by the duo, including their final top 20 hit, "Before and After".

Recording
According to Chad Stuart, the recording had been marked with difficulties with producer Lor Crane: "I remember feeling frustrated because I wanted to arrange everything. Our producer, Lor Crane, ran a pretty tight ship, and he wasn't about to let that happen. To be fair, our touring commitments made it difficult anyway, so we surrendered to the system and went along for the ride."

"Say It Isn't True" was originally written for Freddie and the Dreamers, and was included on their album You Were Mad for Me. Chad Stuart remarked that he liked performing "Tell Me Baby", and Jeremy Clyde enjoyed performing "Evil-Hearted Me".

Reception
In a tepid review for AllMusic, Richie Unterberger comments that, despite having a variety of styles, the album ranges from simply being "modestly enjoyable to mediocre". He also notes the lack of astounding extras included on the expanded 2002 CD reissue.

Track listing
Track listing adapted from LP liner notes.

References

Chad & Jeremy albums
1965 albums